2EL is an Australian radio station, owned by Bill Caralis's Broadcast Operations Group. It is licensed to Orange, New South Wales,
and transmits on 1089kHz on the AM band. BOG purchased the station from AMI during 2005.

The station was opened as 2GZ on 31 October 1935, and vacated by 2GZ on 14 September 1996. 2EL is a relay of BOG's Sydney station 2SM. Tony Wright presents a local show, based in the Orange studios from 12noon to 3pm, Monday to Friday.

External links
Official web site
Official web site

Radio stations in New South Wales
Broadcast Operations Group
Radio stations established in 1935
News and talk radio stations in Australia
Classic hits radio stations in Australia